Jonathan Newman, a British filmmaker and writer.

Jon or Jonathan Newman may also refer to:

 Jonathan Uhry Newman (1927–1991), American attorney and judge
 Jonathan Newman (composer), an American composer and conductor, see Charles Ives Prize
 Jon O. Newman (born 1932), United States federal judge.
Jonathan Newman, former chairman of the Pennsylvania Liquor Control Board.

See also 
 John Newman (disambiguation)